Száraz is a surname. Notable people with the surname include,

 András Száraz (born 1966), Hungarian figure skater
 Benjamín Száraz (born 1998), Slovak footballer
 Evelin Száraz (born 2005), Hungarian Paralympic swimmer
 Marika Száraz (born 1947), Hungarian textile artist